Richard Pandia (born 4 May 1994) is a Papua New Guinean professional rugby league footballer playing for the Ipswich Jets rugby league club and he is the younger brother of team mate and former PNG Kumuls Sebastian Pandia, and is currently the second highest try-scorer in the Intrust Super Cup. He was in the Papua New Guinea Kumuls team that played the Cook Islands at Campbelltown, Sydney on 6 May 2017.

References

1994 births
Living people
Place of birth missing (living people)
Ipswich Jets players
Papua New Guinean rugby league players
Papua New Guinea national rugby league team players
Rugby league fullbacks